Neil Whittaker (born 10 September 1956) is an Australian former professional rugby league footballer who played in the 1970s and 1980s for Balmain in the NSWRL competition. Whittaker was also the chief executive officer of the National Rugby League from 1998 to 1999.

Background
Whittaker was born in Crookwell, New South Wales, Australia

Playing career
Whittaker made his first grade debut for Balmain in Round 6 1979 against Newtown at Henson Park. Over the following 7 seasons, Whittaker became the club's first choice hooker and captained the side. Towards the end of his playing career, Whittaker mainly played from the bench after the emergence of Benny Elias. Whittaker retired from playing at the end of 1985.

Post playing
In 1994, Whittaker became chairman of Balmain and was one of the backers behind the club changing its name and location to become more marketable. It was decided in 1995 that Balmain would change their name to the "Sydney Tigers" and play their home games at Parramatta Stadium. The move started in the same year that the Super League war had begun. By the end of 1996, Balmain reverted to their original name and returned to playing at Leichhardt Oval for the 1997 season as the "Sydney Tigers" experiment was deemed a failure.

In February 1997, Whittaker was appointed John Quayle's successor as Chief Executive of the NSWRL. In July 1997, Whittaker was one of the main stakeholders that began talks with the Parramatta Eels as Balmain were looking to merge with another club.

At the end of 1997, Whittaker helped broker the deal that led to the reunification of the game in January 1998 as the ARL/Super League war was declared over. One condition of the peace agreement between the ARL and News Limited was that there would be a 14 team competition in 2000. The 20 clubs that played in 1998 would be assessed on various items such as sponsorship, crowds, on-field success and the like. It was also announced that clubs that merged would receive a large sum of money, as well as a guaranteed position in the 2000 NRL Competition.

As NRL CEO, Whittaker oversaw clubs such as Hunter Mariners, South Queensland Crushers, Adelaide Rams and the Western Reds culled from the competition. Whittaker was also NRL CEO at a difficult time when foundation clubs such as Balmain and Western Suburbs merged to form the Wests Tigers and North Sydney and South Sydney being axed from the competition.

Whittaker resigned as NRL CEO at the end of the 1999 season.

References

1956 births
Living people
Australian chief executives
Australian rugby league players
Australian rugby league administrators
Balmain Tigers players
Huddersfield Giants coaches
National Rugby League chief executives
Rugby league hookers
Rugby league players from New South Wales